CCPC may refer to:

 Cebu Citizens-Press Council, a press council in Cebu City, Philippines
 Chittagong Cantonment Public College, an educational institution in Bangladesh
 Citizens' Committee for Pollution Control, an environmental organization in Burlington, Ontario, Canada
 Competition and Consumer Protection Commission, a state agency of Ireland
 Crisp County Power Commission, a power commission in the U.S. state of Georgia
 Cuyahoga County Progressive Caucus, a political organization in Cleveland, Ohio
 Certified Career Path Coordinator, a professional designation from Career Path Media, Florida